The India men's national 3x3 team, is controlled by the Basketball Federation of India and represents India in international 3x3 men's (3 against 3) basketball competitions.

FIBA Asia 3x3 Cup
2013  – Quarter–finals
2017  – 9th
2022  – 9th

See also
India women's national 3x3 team
India national basketball team

References

Men's national 3x3 basketball teams
India national basketball team